was a Japanese politician of the Liberal Democratic Party (LDP), a member of the House of Representatives in the Diet (national legislature). A native of Kagoshima Prefecture and graduate of Chuo University, he was elected to the House of Representatives for the first time in 1972 as an independent. He later joined the LDP and served as the Minister of Justice from 2000 to 2001. He was later returned to the post of Minister of Justice under Prime Minister Yasuo Fukuda on 1 August 2008.

Yasuoka was a licensed attorney.  He left the LDP in 1994 to join the now-defunct Shinshinto party, but returned to the LDP in 1995.  Yasuoka is known to have worked himself and his staff very long hours.  He was one of the key participants in the launch of Fukuda's administration in 2007.  Yasuoka also chaired the LDP's Constitution Research Commission.

An avid jogger and swimmer, Yasuoka repeatedly swam the 2.1 km-wide Kinko Bay in Kagoshima Prefecture.

In October 2017, Yasuoka retired after doctors discovered his cancer. Yasuoka's son ran, but lost to Hiroshi Kawauchi of the Constitutional Democratic Party of Japan.

Yasuoka died of cancer on 19 April 2019 at a Tokyo hospital, at the age of 79.

References

External links
 Official website in Japanese.

|-

2019 deaths
1939 births
Deaths from cancer in Japan
Ministers of Justice of Japan
Liberal Democratic Party (Japan) politicians
New Frontier Party (Japan) politicians
20th-century Japanese politicians
Members of the House of Representatives (Japan)
Chuo University alumni
21st-century Japanese politicians